The Finn was a sailing event on the Sailing at the 1988 Summer Olympics program in Pusan, South Korea. Seven races were scheduled. 33 sailors, on 33 boats, from 33 nations competed.

Results 

DNF = Did Not Finish, DSQ = Disqualified, PMS = Premature Start
Crossed out results did not count for the total result.
 = Male,  = Female

Notes

Daily standings

Notes

References 
 
 
 

Finn
Finn competitions
Men's events at the 1988 Summer Olympics